Tyrus Thompson (born November 17, 1991) is a former American football offensive tackle. He played college football at Oklahoma. He was drafted by the Minnesota Vikings in the sixth round of the 2015 NFL Draft.

Early years
Thompson attended Pflugerville High School in Pflugerville, Texas, where he was a two-sport star in both football and track. He was regarded as a four-star recruit and was ranked as the No. 18 offensive tackle in the nation by Scout.com, Rivals.com and ESPN.com. Overall, he was considered the No. 164 overall player by Rivals and No. 133 by PrepStar. Also a standout in track & field, Thompson was one of the state's top performers in the throwing events with personal-bests of 16.96 meters (55-6.25) in the shot put and 42.58 meters (139-7) in the discus.

College career
Thompson attended the University of Oklahoma and played college football under head coach Bob Stoops.

Professional career
Thompson was projected to be selected in the fourth or fifth round by the majority of scouts and NFL draft experts.

Minnesota Vikings
Thompson was drafted by the Vikings in the sixth round, 185th overall, in the 2015 NFL Draft. He was placed on injured reserve on September 6, 2015. He was released on September 18, 2015.

Jacksonville Jaguars
Thompson was signed to the Jaguars' practice squad on September 18, 2015.

Detroit Lions
Thompson signed with the Lions on November 10, 2016. He was released on May 9, 2016.

New Orleans Saints
On May 16, 2016, Thompson signed with the Saints. He was placed on injured reserve on September 4, 2016. He was released on October 10, 2016.

Carolina Panthers
On November 29, 2016, Thompson was signed to the Panthers' practice squad. He signed a reserve/future contract with the Panthers on January 2, 2017. He was waived on August 12, 2017.

Seattle Seahawks
On August 21, 2017, Thompson signed with the Seattle Seahawks. His contract expired on January 4, 2018.

Personal life
Thompson is the son of Raymond and Yolanda Thompson. He was born in Germany while his father was stationed abroad as a paratrooper in the U.S. Army. He chose his jersey number in honor of the year his mother was born. He has two siblings Kaela Thompson and Breya Thompson.

References

External links
Oklahoma Sooners bio

1991 births
Living people
People from Pasadena, Texas
Players of American football from Texas
American football offensive tackles
Oklahoma Sooners football players
Minnesota Vikings players
Jacksonville Jaguars players
Detroit Lions players
New Orleans Saints players
Carolina Panthers players
Seattle Seahawks players
Sportspeople from Harris County, Texas